The first minister of Scotland is the head of the Scottish Government and keeper of the Great Seal of Scotland. The first minister chairs the Scottish Cabinet and is primarily responsible for the formulation, development and presentation of Scottish Government policy. Additional functions of the first minister include promoting and representing Scotland in an official capacity, at home and abroad.

The first minister is nominated by the Scottish Parliament by fellow MSPs, and is formally appointed by the monarch. Members of the Scottish Cabinet and junior ministers of the Scottish Government as well as the Scottish law officers, are appointed by the first minister. As head of the Scottish Government, the first minister is directly accountable to the Scottish Parliament for their actions and the actions of the wider government.

Nicola Sturgeon of the Scottish National Party is the current first minister of Scotland. She assumed office on 20 November 2014, becoming the first woman to hold the position. On 15 February 2023, she announced her resignation, effective upon the election of her successor.

History 
Following the referendum in 1997, in which the Scottish electorate gave their consent, the Scottish Parliament and Scottish Executive (later the Scottish Government) were established by the Parliament of the United Kingdom and the Labour government of the prime minister, Tony Blair.

The former Parliament of Scotland was suspended following the Acts of Union 1707, forming the Parliament of Great Britain. The re-establishment of a dedicated legislature and executive for Scotland was known as devolution and initiated a measure of home rule or self-governance in its domestic affairs, such as health, education and justice. The devolution movement came to a head in the 1970s, and resulted in a Royal Commission on the Constitution, leading to the Scotland Act 1978. This would have established an autonomous Scottish Executive with a leader termed 'First Secretary', a post for which Strathclyde political leader Geoff Shaw was widely expected to be chosen. Shaw died prematurely and the failure of the referendum of 1979 led to the Act not being implemented. 

Following the 1997 referendum and Scotland Act 1998, Scottish devolution resulted in the establishment of a post of first minister to be head of the devolved Scottish Government.

Since 1999, the Secretary of State for Scotland of the British Government has had a much reduced role at the renamed Scotland Office as a result of the transfer of responsibilities to the Scottish Parliament and Scottish Government.

Election and term 

The first minister is nominated by the Scottish Parliament at the beginning of each term, by means of an exhaustive ballot among its members, and is then formally appointed by the monarch.

Although any member of the Scottish Parliament can be nominated for first minister, the government must maintain the confidence of the Scottish Parliament in order to gain supply (access to exchequer funds) and remain in office. For this reason, every permanent first minister has been the leader of the largest party, or the leader of the senior partner in any majority coalition.  There is no term of office for a first minister; they hold office "at His Majesty's pleasure". In practice, a first minister cannot remain in office against the will of the Scottish Parliament; indeed, the Scotland Act explicitly requires the first minister to either resign or seek a parliamentary dissolution (and with it, new elections) if his or her government "no longer enjoys the confidence of the Parliament."  Whenever the office of first minister falls vacant, the sovereign is responsible for appointing the new incumbent upon nomination by the Scottish Parliament; the appointment is formalised at a meeting between the sovereign and the first minister designate.

Given the additional member system used to elect its members, it is difficult for a single party to gain an overall majority of seats in the Scottish Parliament. The SNP did gain an overall majority of seats in the 2011 election, and thus had enough numbers to vote in its leader, Alex Salmond, as first minister for a second term.

After the election of the Scottish Parliament, a first minister must be nominated within a period of 28 days. Under the terms of the Scotland Act, if the Parliament fails to nominate a first minister, within this time frame, it will be dissolved and a fresh election held. If an incumbent first minister is defeated in a general election, they do not immediately vacate office. The first minister only leaves office when the Scottish Parliament nominates a successor individual.

After accepting office, the first minister takes the Official Oath, as set out in the Promissory Oaths Act 1868. The oath is tendered by the Lord President of the Court of Session at a sitting of the Court in Parliament House in Edinburgh. The oath is:

The period in office of a first minister is not linked to the term of members of the Scottish Parliament. The Scotland Act set out a four-year maximum term for each session of Parliament. The Act specifies than an election to the Scottish Parliament will be held on the first Thursday in May, every four years, starting from 1999. Parliament can be dissolved and an extraordinary general election held, before the expiration of the four-year term, but only if two-thirds (or more) of elected MSPs vote for such action in a resolution of the Scottish Parliament.  If a simple majority of MSPs voted a no-confidence motion in the first minister or government, that would trigger a 28-day period for the nomination of a replacement; should that time period expire without the nomination of a new first minister, then an extraordinary election would have to be called.

The first minister, once appointed, continues in office as the head of the Scottish Government until they resign, are dismissed or die in office. Resignation can be triggered by the passage of a Motion of No Confidence in the first minister or the Scottish Government or by rejecting a motion of confidence in the Scottish Parliament. In those situations, the first minister must tender their resignation and the resignation of their government. In such circumstances, the presiding officer would appoint an interim first minister, until the Scottish Parliament determined on a new nominee to be appointed by the monarch.

Powers 

The role and powers of the first minister are set out in Sections 45 to 49 of the Scotland Act 1998.

Following their appointment, the first minister may then nominate ministers to sit in the Scottish Cabinet and junior ministers to form the Scottish Government. They are then formally elected by the Scottish Parliament. Ministers hold office at His Majesty's Pleasure and may be removed from office, at any time, by the first minister. The first minister also has the power to appoint the law officers and chief legal officers of the Scottish Government – the lord advocate and the solicitor general but only with the support of the Scottish Parliament.

The first minister is responsible to the Scottish Parliament for their actions and the actions of the overall Scottish Government. MSPs can scrutinise the activities of the first minister and their Cabinet by tabling written questions or by asking oral questions in the Scottish Parliament. Direct questioning of the first minister takes place at First Minister's Questions (FMQs) each Thursday at noon when Parliament is sitting. The 30-minute session enables MSPs to ask questions of the first minister, on any issue. The leaders of the largest opposition parties have an allocation of questions and are allowed to question the first minister each week. Opposition leaders normally ask an opening question to the first minister, relating to their meeting with the Scottish Cabinet, or when they next expect to meet the Prime Minister, and then follow this up by asking a supplementary question on an issue of their choosing.

In addition to direct questioning, the first minister is also able to deliver oral statements to the Scottish Parliament chamber, after which members are invited to question the first minister on the substance of the statement. For example, at the beginning of each parliamentary term, the first minister normally delivers a statement, setting out the legislative programme of the Government, or a statement of government priorities over the forthcoming term.

Associated with the office of first minister, there is also the post of deputy first minister. Unlike the office of first minister, the post of deputy is not recognised in statute and confers no extra status on the holder. Like the first minister, the deputy first minister is an elected member of the Scottish Parliament and a member of the Scottish Government. From 1999 to 2007, when Scotland was governed by a Labour–Liberal Democrat coalition, the leader of the Liberal Democrats – the junior government party – was given the role of deputy first minister; a title which they held in conjunction with another ministerial portfolio. For example, Nicol Stephen, deputy first minister from 2005 to 2007, simultaneously held the post of Minister for Enterprise and Lifelong Learning.

On two occasions since 1999, the deputy first minister has assumed the role of 'acting' first minister, inheriting the powers of the first minister in their absence or incapacitation. From 11 October 2000 to 26 October 2000, following the death in office of the then First Minister Donald Dewar, his deputy Jim Wallace became acting first minister, until the Labour party appointed a new leader, and consequently first minister. Wallace also became Acting First Minister between 8 November 2001 and 22 November 2001, following the resignation of Henry McLeish.

An officer with such a title need not always exist; rather, the existence of the post is dependent on the form of Cabinet organisation preferred by the first minister and their party. The deputy first minister does not automatically succeed if a vacancy in the premiership is suddenly created. It may be necessary for the deputy to stand in for the first minister on occasion, for example by taking the floor at First Minister's Questions.

Precedence and privileges 

The first minister is, by virtue of section 45(7) of the Scotland Act 1998, ex officio the keeper of the Great Seal of Scotland and their place in the order of precedence in Scotland is determined by the holding of that office. The scale of precedence in Scotland was amended by royal warrant on 30 June 1999 to take account of devolution and the establishment of the post of first minister. The amended scale reflected the transfer of the office of keeper of the Great Seal from the secretary of state for Scotland to the first minister and also created a rank for the presiding officer of the Scottish Parliament. Throughout Scotland, the first minister outranks all others except the royal family, lord lieutenants, the sheriff principal, the Lord Chancellor, the moderator of the General Assembly of the Church of Scotland, the prime minister of the United Kingdom, Commonwealth prime ministers (whilst in the United Kingdom), the speaker of the House of Commons and the Lord Speaker.

As of April 2015, the first minister is entitled to draw a total salary of £144,687, which is composed of a basic MSP salary of £59,089 plus an additional salary of £85,598 for the role as first minister. This can be compared to the UK Prime Minister who is entitled to draw a total salary of £142,500, composed of a basic MP salary of £67,060 and an additional office holder's salary of £75,440 (the total entitlement for the prime minister had peaked at £198,661 in April 2011 but this was then dropped by around 25%). The first minister is the highest paid member of the Scottish Government. Sturgeon said she would claim £135,605, £9,082 less than her entitlement, as part of a voluntary pay freeze pegging her salary to 2008/09 levels.

The first minister traditionally resides at Bute House which is located at number 6 Charlotte Square in the New Town of Edinburgh. The house became the property of the National Trust for Scotland in 1966, after the death of the previous owner John Crichton-Stuart, 4th Marquess of Bute and remains in the ownership of the National Trust for Scotland. Prior to devolution, Bute House was the official residence of the Secretary of State for Scotland. Weekly meetings of the Scottish Cabinet take place in the Cabinet room of the house. Bute House is also where the first minister holds press conferences, hosts visiting dignitaries and employs and dismisses government Ministers. The Office of the First Minister is located at St Andrews House in Edinburgh.

Appointments to the Privy Council of the United Kingdom are made by the monarch, although in practice they are made only on the advice of the UK government. To date all first ministers have been appointed members of the Privy Council, and therefore entitled to use the style 'Right Honourable'.

The first minister is one of the few individuals in Scotland officially permitted to fly the Royal Banner of Scotland.

List of nominating elections

Timeline of Scottish first ministers

Notes

See also
 List of current heads of government in the United Kingdom and dependencies

References

External links 
 Office of the First Minister of Scotland website
 Scottish Cabinet
 Scottish Parliament Official Report

Lists of political office-holders in Scotland
 
Scotland politics-related lists
Ministerial posts of the Scottish Government